D. Pedro de Sousa Holstein, 1st Duke of Faial and Palmela (8 May 1781–12 October 1850) was one of the most important Portuguese diplomats and statesmen in the first half of the 19th century. He also served as the country's first modern Prime Minister (with the title of "President of the Council of Ministers").

Early life and career

He was born in Turin, a scion of the Portuguese de Sousa family, Lords of Calhariz.

The 'Holstein' element of his family name came from his paternal grandmother Princess Maria Anna Leopoldine of Schleswig-Holstein-Sonderburg-Beck, daughter of Frederick William I, Duke of Schleswig-Holstein-Sonderburg-Beck.

His uncle  had been governor of Portuguese India.

He earned notoriety at an early age by telling Napoleon to his face at the conference in Bayonne in 1808 that the Portuguese would not ‘consent to become Spaniards’ as the French Emperor wanted.

He was Portuguese plenipotentiary to the Congress of Vienna in 1814, where he attempted to press Portugal's claims to Olivenza, and to the Congress of Paris in 1815.

After this he was briefly ambassador to London, but then was appointed secretary of state for foreign affairs in Brazil. After the Portuguese Revolution of 1820 he was commissioned by the revolutionary junta to inform the king, João VI, of what had taken place and to request his return to Portugal from Brazil.

In 1823 he was made a Marquis and became foreign minister as well as head of the committee which D. João appointed to devise a new constitutional charter. The resulting document, to which the King was unable to agree, was so liberal that it drew down on Palmela the hatred of the reactionary forces in the country, especially the Queen and the Infant Dom Miguel, who in 1824 had him arrested.

After he obtained his liberty he was made a minister of state and returned to London as ambassador.

Liberal Wars 
When Dom Miguel seized the throne of Portugal in 1828 Palmela sided with the opposition in Oporto and was forced with many others to flee to England. An attempt to return to Oporto in June 1828, called the Belfastada, failed. Greville noted in his diary for 16 August 1828:
”Esterhazy told me to-night that Palmella entertains from twenty to thirty of his countrymen at dinner every day, of whom there are several hundred in London, of the best families, totally destitute.”

Miguel condemned him to death in absentia and seized his estates, but Dom Pedro, Emperor of Brazil, appointed Palmela guardian to his daughter, the rightful Queen Maria II, and he acted as her ambassador at the British court.

In 1830 he set up the young queen’s regency on Terceira in the Azores; it was at this time that he became acquainted with Captain Charles Napier whom he considered the best person to command the Liberals' navy.

When Dom Pedro took charge of the regency in person in 1832 he named Palmela as his foreign minister, in which capacity he acted against Miguel from London.

In 1833 he sailed with Charles Napier bringing mercenary reinforcements to Oporto, where Pedro was being besieged, and took part in the subsequent expedition to the Algarve of Napier and the Duke of Terceira.

After Napier’s naval victory off Cape St Vincent enabled Pedro to occupy Lisbon, Palmela retired from his offices.

Constitutional Monarchy 

He served as the first Prime Minister of the newly formed constitutional monarchy in Portugal from 24 September 1834 to 4 May 1835.

He served briefly Prime Minister again in February 1842 (for two days, in the so-called Shrovetide Cabinet), and from March to October 1846 (during the height of the Revolution of Maria da Fonte).

Dom Pedro was successively made Count of Palmela (by Queen Maria I, on 11 April 1812), Marquis of Palmela (by King John VI on 3 July 1823) and Duke of Faial (by Queen Maria II on 4 April 1836).

Finally, on 18 October 1850, Queen Maria II substituted its Dukedom of Faial by the new title of Duke of Palmela.

Marriage and Issue
On 4 June 1810 Pedro de Sousa Holstein married Eugénia Francisca Xavier Teles da Gama (1798–1860). Their issue was:

Alexandre de Sousa e Holstein (1812–1832), 1st Count of Calhariz;
Domingos de Sousa Holstein (1818–1864), succeeded his father as 2nd Duke of Palmela;
Rodrigo de Sousa (1824–1840),
Francisco de Sousa Holstein (1838–1878), 1st Marquis of Sousa Holstein;
Tomás de Sousa e Holstein Beck (1839–1887), 1st Marquis of Sesimbra;
Filipe de Sousa Holstein (1841–1884), 1st Marquis of Monfalim;

See also
Devorismo

References

External links
 Genealogy of Pedro Sousa Holstein, 1st Duke of Palmela, in Portuguese

|-

Counts of Palmela
Margraves of Palmela
Dukes of Palmela
Dukes of Faial
Portuguese diplomats
1781 births
1850 deaths
Prime Ministers of Portugal
Finance ministers of Portugal
Foreign ministers of Portugal
Ambassadors of Portugal to Denmark
Ambassadors of Portugal to Germany
Ambassadors of Portugal to Italy
Ambassadors of Portugal to Spain
Ambassadors of Portugal to the United Kingdom
Portuguese nobility
Knights of the Golden Fleece of Spain
Portuguese people of German descent
Portuguese people of Italian descent
H